Leuconycta diphteroides, the green leuconycta moth or green owlet, is a moth of the family Noctuidae. The species was first described by Achille Guenée in 1852. It is found in North America from Nova Scotia to Florida, west to Texas and north to Saskatchewan.

The wingspan is 27–32 mm. The forewings are suffused with green but may be all white in rare cases. There is a small black rectangular blotch which touches the costa near the base and another larger blotch halfway along the costa. One form has a number of black lines and spots scattered across the wing surface, while form "obliterata" is relatively unmarked. The hindwings are pale grayish with a dull yellowish terminal band. Adults are on wing from May to September.

The larvae feed on Solidago and Aster species.

References

Moths described in 1852
Acontiinae
Moths of North America